Conservation and restoration of rail vehicles aims to preserve historic rail vehicles.

Trains
It may concern trains that have been removed from service and later restored to their past condition, or have never been removed from service, like UP 844, the only U.S. steam locomotive to never be retired. They are often operated in present-day service as moving examples of living history, as opposed to static exhibits. The majority of restored trains are operated at heritage railways and railway museums, although they can also be found on the main lines or branch lines of the commercial working railway, operated by specialist railtour companies or museum groups.

For authenticity, the location/route of preserved trains is often chosen to match the original trains used. Heritage railways and railway museums aim to restore and operate restored trains. Trains are often restored to the original authentic livery of their original owner.

In the United States

The restoration of historic railway equipment has gained importance in the United States, primarily because of a large amount of steam locomotives and cabooses donated by railroads to cities and museums, many of which have been displayed in parks for many years. Often these restoration projects are accomplished by a local railroad club or chapters of a national organization.

Examples of major projects accomplished by clubs are D&RGW 315, which was displayed in the city park in Durango, Colorado, until removed by the Durango Railway Historical Society and restored to operation, as well as D&RGW 223, which was displayed at Liberty Park in Salt Lake City, Utah until moved to Ogden and restored by the Golden Spike Chapter of the Railway & Locomotive Historical Society.

Eureka & Palisades 4, also known as the Eureka, was purchased by a lawyer from Reno, Nevada. She was restored and is still privately owned, operating occasionally on the Durango & Silverton and Cumbres & Toltec Scenic Railroads in Colorado.

Streetcars

Heritage streetcars or heritage trams are a part of the efforts to preserve rail transit heritage. In addition to preserving street-running rail vehicles, heritage streetcar operations can include upkeep of historic rail infrastructure. Working heritage streetcars are closely related to the growing global heritage railway movement and form a part of the living history of rail transport.

The vehicles are called streetcars or trolleys in North America and trams or tramcars elsewhere. The first two terms are often used interchangeably in the United States, with trolley being preferred in the eastern US and streetcar in Canada and the western US. In parts of the United States, internally powered buses made to resemble a streetcar are often referred to as "trolleys". To avoid further confusion with trolley buses,  the American Public Transportation Association (APTA) refers to them as "trolley-replica buses".

Museums, heritage tram line operators, and amateur enthusiasts can preserve original vintage vehicles or create replicas of historic vehicles to re-create or preserve streetcar technology of the past. Heritage vehicles that are kept fully functional can be used on heritage tramlines or for charter traffic.

Europe

Austria 
The Remise Museum in Vienna, opened in 2014, covers the history of public transport in the city of Vienna and offers an extensive tram collection to visitors.
The Styrian municipality centre Graz has a tram museum since 1971 located in the depot of Mariatrost. Another heritage tram is operating in Styria between the railway station of Mariazell and the nearby Erlaufsee, mainly with Ex-Vienna streetcars. This line was recently electrified on longer sections and also extended towards the city center. In Innsbruck the city's trams are collected and renovated – together with other Tyrolean railway vehicles – by the association Tiroler MuseumsBahnen which has its museum in the old station of the Stubaitalbahn.

Benelux 
In Amsterdam in the Netherlands the Electrisch Museumtramlijn operates historic trams over a  length of former railway line. The tram networks of The Hague and Rotterdam have also their tram museums. The association Tramweg Stichting maintains and operates in every three cities its own vehicles, partly as collection of these museums. In Belgium there are 3 tram museums, one in Brussels – organizing several weekend rides to Tervueren and around the city – and other in Antwerp. The  Kusttram (the coastal line between Knokke and De Panne via Ostend) features also some vehicles of the once extensive interurban network stored in the depot of De Panne and Knokke operated by TTO.

Bulgaria 
In Sofia there are operating heritage trams.

Czech Republic 
In Prague the Czech Republic the Prague Integrated Transport operates Historical Tram Line No. 41 at weekends using historical tram vehicles and a week-long operating Nostalgic Tram Line No. 23 using old PCC based ČKD Tatra T3 tram vehicles.
Historical trams are also seasonally operated in Brno.

Estonia 
In Tallinn there are renovated retrotrams in public use since 2017.

Finland 

In Helsinki, Finland, Oy Stadin Ratikat Ab offers charter tramrides with vintage cars and in summer months operates an in-street heritage tram line on the Helsinki tram network.

France 

In France, the Deûle Valley tramway near Lille which runs along a  track from Marquette-lez-Lille to Wambrechies features several tram vehicles dating back to the beginning of the 20th century.

Hungary 

In Hungary all of the four tram systems (Budapest, Debrecen, Miskolc, Szeged) have operating heritage trams.

In Budapest heritage trams first operated in 1987. Its fleet contains quite a few vehicles (trams, buses, trolleybuses, even metrocars) from the late 19th century until recent years and there are many more waiting to be repaired. Heritage services are mainly operated from April/May to September/October on weekends. There are both heritage and retro lines. The retro lines can be used with normal (seasonal) tickets, however, on heritage lines other, heritage (seasonal) tickets are needed. In 2019 there are two heritage tram lines. one retro tram line, one heritage bus line and one retro bus line operated regularly. Occasionally there are other lines in operation. There is also one vintage tram line - Tram Line 1956 - operating yearly in late October as a memorial for the Hungarian Revolution of 1956, it can be used with normal (seasonal) tickets.

In Debrecen there are also a few vintage trams. They are operated less regularly, mostly on certain occasions.

In Miskolc there are also a few vintage trams and buses. They are operated less regularly, mostly on certain occasions.

In Szeged there are also a few vintage trams, buses and trolleybuses. Trams are in service on certain summer weekends. Otherwise, they are operated less regularly, mostly on certain occasions.

For about a one-month period near Christmas, each city operates light trams (trams that are decorated with LED strips and/or Christmas decoration). These trams operate on various lines around the cities in the late afternoons, evenings, and can be used by normal (seasonal) tickets usually. At the same time each of these cities, except Miskolc, light trolleybuses are operated in the same way as trams.

Italy 

Turin, in the northwest of Italy, operates the historical route 7, a double way circular route around the town centre.
Turin is the first town in Italy with tramway lines powered by historical streetcars.
The inauguration of the heritage tramway line was during the
celebrations of the 150th anniversary of national unity, in March 2011.

In the nearby metropolis of Milan, the continued, extensive use of the "Series 1500 tram" is an example of a heritage tramway which blends into everyday urban life to the extent that it is not regarded as one.

Norway 
In Bergen the Bergens Elektriske Sporvei has operated a short heritage tramway since 1993.

In Oslo the Tramway Museum operates veteran trams on the tram network of Oslo on the first Sunday of every month.

Portugal 
Heritage trams provide all of the service on some of the Lisbon tramway network in Portugal, and in Porto a long-closed section of tramway in the historic Batalha section of the town center was reopened in 2007 for use by historic trams.  There are now three such heritage routes in Porto, as well as a tram museum. In Sintra, there is a seasonally operated heritage tramway.

Romania 

STB in Bucharest maintains an extensive fleet of heritage trams on its tram system.

Russia 
In Saint-Petersburg on Vasilyevsky Island the former Vasileostrovsky tram depot, which closed in the 1990s after the city's extensive tram network was cut down due to increasing automobile traffic, was converted into the Museum of Electrical Transport. Apart from excursions to itself, the museum organizes museum fleet rides along downtown tracks (including some now otherwise unused for regular tram service) on a number of public festivals and some summer weekends. A heritage tram of the type that used to run from the inner city nearly to the nearby front line during the World War II siege of the city is installed as a war and tram memorial, not far from Avtovo metro station. A modern replica of a late-19th-century horsecar stands in front of Vasileostrovskaya metro station.

Spain 

In Spain, a new heritage tramway was opened in A Coruña (La Coruña) in 1997. However, since 2011 is out of order. Tramvia Blau in Barcelona has been in operation since 1904 but still uses trams built in 1904–15, and thus has become a heritage line. Similarly, the tramway connecting Sóller with Puerto de Sóller, on the island of Majorca, is operated with vintage trams and has been opened since 1913. Therefore, it is a heritage line.

Sweden 
In Malmö, Sweden, a technical museum operates an in-street heritage tram line in summer months. In Sweden's capital, Stockholm, a  section of former route 7 was reopened in 1991 as a heritage tramway, using vintage cars.

A further tram Museum is situated in Malmköping.

Turkey 
Two separate heritage tramways operate in Istanbul, Turkey; T2 on the European side of the Bosporus and T3 on the Asian side. The former opened in 1991 between Tünel (funicular station) and Taksim metro station, and the latter in 2003 in the suburb of Kadıköy.

A heritage tramline, opened in 2011, serves Bursa.

United Kingdom 
In the United Kingdom the majority of tram lines were lifted before the heritage movement began to flourish, and tracks and trams scrapped. Although trams are returning to British Cities, they are modern transportation systems (also known as light rail), not heritage operations. There are, however, three notable heritage tram operations in the UK.

The National Tramway Museum at Crich near Matlock, is located in an old limestone quarry in Derbyshire, and has a collection of preserved trams. Strictly speaking, this would be considered a tramway museum with an operating tram line, rather than being a heritage tramway.  Among the heritage railways on the Isle of Man, at least the Manx Electric Railway qualifies as a heritage tramway as well. Otherwise, the Blackpool tramway is the only surviving first-generation urban tram system in the UK and provides a service running along the town's promenade and also as far as Fleetwood using both historic and modern trams. There is also a modern "Heritage Tramway"  in Birkenhead, Merseyside.

Places in Britain where preserved trams operate:

England 
 Beamish Museum, (near Stanley, County Durham, North-East England)
 Black Country Living Museum, (in Dudley nr Wolverhampton, in the West Midlands)
 Blackpool Tramway, (in Blackpool in Lancashire, North-West England)
 East Anglia Transport Museum, (near Lowestoft in Suffolk, East Anglia)
 Heaton Park Tramway, (in Greater Manchester, North-West England)
 National Tramway Museum, (at Crich nr Matlock, Derbyshire, in the East Midlands)
 Seaton Tramway, (in Devon, South-West England)
 Shipley Glen Tramway, (near Saltaire in West Yorkshire), Northern England
 Volk's Electric Tramway, (in Brighton, East Sussex, South-East England)
 Wirral Tramway (in Birkenhead, on Merseyside, North-West England)

Isle of Man 
 Manx Electric Tramway, on the Isle of Man

Scotland 
 Summerlee Heritage Park, (near Coatbridge, in North Lanarkshire), Scotland

Wales 
 Great Orme Tramway, (in Llandudno, North Wales)

North America

Canada 

 The Edmonton Radial Railway Society restores and operates historic streetcars on two lines in Edmonton, Alberta. Five streetcars transport guests around Fort Edmonton Park, and three streetcars — including one from Japan and another from Australia —  operate on a second line that takes passengers between Whyte Avenue and Jasper Avenue, via the High Level Bridge. An additional 17 streetcars are either being restored by volunteers, or awaiting restoration. The organization is named after the Edmonton Radial Railway, which operated streetcars in the city for 43 years.

 Toronto Transit Commission: retains a fleet of heritage streetcars. All are currently out of service following the conversion of the system to pantograph current collection. Previously, 2 PCC and 1 Peter Witt cars were used on regular streetcar tracks, on a private-rental basis as well as for special events. The TTC often operated a PCC streetcar on route 509 Harbourfront on Sundays during the summer.

United States 

The San Francisco Municipal Railway, or Muni, runs exclusively historic trolleys on its heavily used F Market & Wharves line. The line serves Market Street and the tourist areas along the Embarcadero, including Fisherman's Wharf.

Boston's Massachusetts Bay Transportation Authority runs exclusively PCC streetcars on its Ashmont-Mattapan High Speed Line, part of that authority's Red Line. The historic rolling stock is retained because doing so cost less than would a full rebuild of the line to accommodate either a heavy rail line (like the rest of the Red Line or the Blue or Orange Lines) or a modern light rail line (like the Green Line). It is also unique in that it used almost exclusively by commuters and is not particularly popular with tourists (and thus may not really be a true heritage system, despite the historic rolling stock).

Dallas has the McKinney Avenue Transit Authority. Denver has the Platte Valley Trolley, a heritage line recalling the open-sided streetcars of the early 20th century. Old Pueblo Trolley is a volunteer-run heritage line in Tucson, Arizona; its popularity inspired, in large part, a modern streetcar system for Tucson currently in the final planning stages, which would incorporate the heritage line. The VTA in San Jose, California also maintains a heritage trolley fleet, for occasional use on the downtown portion of a new light rail system opened in 1988. Other cities with heritage streetcar lines include Galveston, Texas; Kenosha, Wisconsin and San Pedro, California (home of the port of Los Angeles). The National Park Service operates a system in Lowell, Massachusetts.

In San Francisco, parts of the cable car and Muni streetcar system (specifically the above-mentioned F Market & Wharves line) are heritage lines, although they are also functioning parts of the city's transit system. The cable cars are a National Historic Landmark and are rare examples of vehicles with this distinction. Located east of San Francisco is one of several museums in the U.S. that restore and operate vintage streetcars and interurbans, the Western Railway Museum.

The Fort Collins Municipal Railway operates Birney Safety Cars on a restored track that runs from City Park to Old Town in Fort Collins, Colorado.

South America

Argentina 

In Buenos Aires, Argentina, a heritage tram line was inaugurated In 1980 in the Caballito neighbourhood on existing vintage street tracks. Presently a proposal for a heritage tram in colonial San Telmo is under discussion.

Argentina's capital also hosts the La Brugeoise cars, the Buenos Aires Metro (Subte) Line A rolling stock, since its inauguration in 1913.  They were built by Belgian railway rolling stock manufacturer La Brugeoise, et Nicaise, et Delcuve between 1911 and 1919 for the Anglo-Argentine Tramways Company's (Compañía de Tranvías Anglo-Argentina, CTAA in Spanish) first metro line.  They were originally designed to run both as metro and tramway cars, but they were refurbished in 1927 for underground use only.  They are the oldest metro rolling stock in commercial service in the world as well as a tourist attraction and part of Buenos Aires cultural heritage. The A line also contains a vintage station, Perú. They have been in continuous use for a whole century since 1913 to January 2013 when they were replaced by new coaches, with an average of about 300 thousand daily passengers, up from the 170,000 who traveled on them on their first day. Some of the coaches had already been preserved for touristic purposes, and now the rest of the fleet is under careful restoration and is intended to render service on weekends and holidays.

Brazil 
The line is being extended, and additional trams have been added.

Belém: A heritage tramway was opened in the city of Belém in 2005.

Campinas: A heritage tramway has been in operation at Campinas's Parque Portugal  since 1972.

Rio de Janeiro: The Santa Teresa Tramway, which has operated in the Santa Teresa district of Rio de Janeiro since the 19th century, is not primarily a tourist line but can be considered a heritage tramway because of its continued use of vintage or, since 2015, faux-vintage tramcars.

Chile 
A heritage tramway was opened in Iquique, Chile, in 2004.

Peru 
A heritage tramway was opened in Lima, Peru, in 1997.

Uruguay 
The first heritage tramway in Latin America opened in Montevideo, Uruguay, in 1967, using a restored vintage tram on a reopened section of former tram line. It closed in 1974.

Asia

China 
 Heritage trams also operate in Changchun, Jilin, and Dalian, Liaoning.

Hong Kong 
The Hong Kong Tramways and Peak Tram on Hong Kong Island are considered part of the heritage of Hong Kong.

Africa

South Africa 
There has been a heritage tramway in Kimberley, Northern Cape, since 1985.

Oceania

Australia 
The most significant heritage line operates in Melbourne, the City Circle tram, using historic Melbourne tramcars, which shares its route with other regular tram lines. Heritage lines also exist in Ballarat, Bendigo, Sydney and Brisbane.

New Zealand 
A new city-center heritage tramway was opened in Christchurch in 1995. Auckland also has a short heritage line loop in the Wynyard Quarter District called The Dockline Tram, which opened 2011, closed several times due major roadworks and reopened in 2021 being operated on behalf of the Auckland Council's Development arm by the Museum of Transport & Technology.

Bibliography 
 Carlson et al. (1986), The Colorful Streetcars We Rode, Bulletin 125 of the Central Electric Railfans' Association, Chicago, Il. 
 Taplin, Michael; and Russell, Michael (2002). Trams in Western Europe. Harrow Weald, Middlesex, UK: Capital Transport Publishing.

References

See also

 Cable car (railway)
 Gandy dancer
 Horsecar
 Heritage railway
 List of heritage railways
 List of town tramway systems
 Heritage railways in Britain
Motive power depot
Railway workshop
 San Francisco Historic Trolley Festival

 
Heritage railways
Tram transport